Moses Kacoul Machar (born 1945) was the Second Vice President of Sudan from February 2001 to January 2005. In 2004, he was sent abroad for medical treatment for an unspecified illness. Machar was also involved with talks with the Foreign Minister of Yemen, Abu Bakr al-Qerbi to forge a stronger relationship between the two countries.

References

Living people
Vice presidents of Sudan
1945 births